This is a list of notable criollos.

TV and cinema 
 Angelines Fernández
 María Montez
 Guillermo del Toro

Music 
 Miguel Bosé
 Juanes
 Kike Santander
 Gustavo Santander

Government and military 
 José Artigas
 Simón Bolívar 
 Fidel Castro
 Manuel Dominguez
 José Martí
 Agustín de Iturbide
 Juan Leal
 Juan Ponce de León II
 Francisco de Miranda
 Bernardo O'Higgins

Writers
 Jorge Luis Borges
 Mario Vargas Llosa

See also 
 Latin Americans
 White Hispanic and Latino Americans

References

Lists of Spanish people
Lists of people by ethnicity